Abdulla Al-Karbi (born 10 June 1990) is an Emirati-born Qatari handball player for Al Sadd and the Qatari national team.

References

1990 births
Living people
Asian Games medalists in handball
Handball players at the 2014 Asian Games
Qatari male handball players
Asian Games gold medalists for Qatar
Naturalised citizens of Qatar
Qatari people of Emirati descent
Medalists at the 2014 Asian Games